Carlos Esteban Ross Cotal (born 23 November 1990) is a Chilean footballer who plays as a winger for Sport Huancayo. He has been international with his country (Chile).

Ross has played in six countries, three continents (South America, Europe, Asia). He has also been summoned five times to the (Chile national football team).

In 2019, he played the International Cup (Copa Sudamericana), was the top assist provider and team of the year of (2019 Copa Bicentenario), also top assist provider and 2nd top score in the team Sport Huancayo. In 2022 he returns to the Professional League of Peru (LIGA 1). In his first ten games he has made seven assists and scored two goals.

International career

He has played with the best generation of players in the history of the Chile national team: Alexis Sánchez, Arturo Vidal, Claudio Bravo, Jorge Valdivia, Gary Medel, among others.

The coaches who called Ross to the national team were Marcelo Bielsa and Claudio Borghi.

He has been summoned on five occasions to the Chile national football team, playing three matches.

He made his debut in the national team against Venezuela, entering by José Pedro Fuenzalida, in the city of Temuco, Chile, in that match also they played Gary Medel, Eduardo Vargas, Charles Aránguiz, among others.

His second game was against the selection of Northern Ireland, entering by Arturo Vidal. in the city of Chillán, Chile.

Participates in a friendly match which made Chile. In South Africa, against New Zealand.

International matches

Statistical summary

Honours

Individual
 Copa Bicentenario top assist provider: 2019
 Audax Italiano Best Young Player: 2009
 Torneo Apertura 2nd top score: 2011
 Top Score of Coquimbo Unido (12 goals: 2011
Top assist provider of Coquimbo Unido (6 assists): 2011
Top assist provider of Deportes Copiapó (5 assists): 2013
Top assist provider of Deportes Copiapó (5 assists): 2013
 Top Score of Al-Mujazzal Club (7 goals: 2018
Top assist provider of Sport Huancayo (8 assists): 2019
Copa Bicentenario team of the year: 2019
 Copa Bicentenario top assist provider: 2019

Club
Audax Italiano
Chilean Football Youth Leagues: 2009

O'Higgins F.C.
Chilean Primera División runner-up: 2012

Cobresal
Campeonato Loto: 2018

Sport Huancayo
Copa Bicentenario runner-up: 2019

References

External links
 
 Carlos Ross at playmakerstats.com (English version of ceroacero.es)

1990 births
Living people
People from Copiapó
Chilean people of English descent
Chilean footballers
Chile under-20 international footballers
Chile youth international footballers
Chile international footballers
Audax Italiano footballers
Coquimbo Unido footballers
O'Higgins F.C. footballers
Deportes Copiapó footballers
Unión La Calera footballers
Husqvarna FF players
Hapoel Nof HaGalil F.C. players
Gimnasia y Esgrima de Mendoza footballers
Boca Unidos footballers
Platense F.C. players
Cobresal footballers
Al-Mujazzal Club players
Sport Huancayo footballers
Cobreloa footballers
Chilean Primera División players
Primera B de Chile players
Segunda División Profesional de Chile players
Superettan players
Liga Leumit players
Torneo Federal A players
Primera Nacional players
Liga Nacional de Fútbol Profesional de Honduras players
Saudi First Division League players
Peruvian Primera División players
Chilean expatriate sportspeople in Sweden
Expatriate footballers in Sweden
Chilean expatriate sportspeople in Israel
Expatriate footballers in Israel
Chilean expatriate sportspeople in Argentina
Expatriate footballers in Argentina
Chilean expatriate sportspeople in Honduras
Expatriate footballers in Honduras
Chilean expatriate sportspeople in Saudi Arabia
Expatriate footballers in Saudi Arabia
Chilean expatriate sportspeople in Peru
Expatriate footballers in Peru
Association football forwards